TCON or TCon may refer to:
 The Chronicles of Narnia, a fantasy novel series
 a Truck CONstructed (TCON) or built (trailer closed) for transport from one location to another without opening the trailer at an intermediate cross dock facility used in Less than truckload shipping.
 a common name for a flat panel display timing controller ASIC.
The Conduit, a 2009 first-person shooter video game

See also 
 Unit load
 Corrugated box design
 Track and trace
 Dimensional weight